Fu Hsing Broadcasting Station (FHBS) is a state-run radio station sponsored by Republic of China Armed Forces, located on the campus of Ming Chuan University in Taipei, Taiwan and is operated by the Ministry of National Defense. Its website is currently blocked in the People's Republic of China.

History and overview

Fu Hsing Broadcasting Station was founded on 1 August 1957, with units in Taipei, Taichung, and Kaohsiung. The station currently operates two radio networks. The first network acts as a "cross-strait" information service for domestic audiences. The second network and a shortwave network provides mainland Chinese audiences with propaganda about Taiwan and the Republic of China.

Frequency

Taipei
  AM558, 909 kHz, the second radio network: AM594, 1089 kHz

Taichung
  FM107.8 MHz second radio network: AM594, 1089 kHz

Kaohsiung
  AM594 kHz, the second radio network: AM846 kHz

Mainland China
  HF Net: 9410, 9774, 15375 kHz

See also
Media in Taiwan
 Radio Taiwan International
Propaganda in the Republic of China
 Voice of Han
 Cross-Strait war of propaganda
 China National Radio
 Voice of the Strait

References

External links

Fu Hsing Radio
Voice of Fuhsing

Military of the Republic of China
Mandarin-language radio stations
Radio stations in Taiwan
Censorship in China
Radio stations established in 1956
Mass media in Taipei
Public broadcasting in Taiwan
Propaganda in Taiwan
Mass media of the military